Fabio Bertoli (born 20 August 1996) in Montichiari, is an Italian professional footballer who currently plays for Italian side Bedizzolese as a  midfielder.,and right forward.

Club career
Bertoli is a youth exponent from Brescia Calcio. He made his debut on 30 August 2014 against Frosinone Calcio in a Serie B game playing almost the entire game, before being substituted after 89 minutes for Mario Gargiulo.

References

External links
 Footballdatabase.eu
 Fabio Bertoli at TuttoCampo

Living people
1996 births
Sportspeople from the Province of Brescia
Italian footballers
Association football midfielders
Brescia Calcio players
Piacenza Calcio 1919 players
A.C. Prato players
Serie B players
Serie C players
Footballers from Lombardy